Michael Magalon  (born August 24, 1975) is a Belgian jazz bassist, guitarist, and composer.

Biography
Magalon started playing classical guitar at 12. At 18, he composed the music for the play Couleur de Femmes by Jacques Henrard adapted by Marc Gooris] (1993).

After gaining experience with a number of bands Magalon studied at the Jazz Studio] in Antwerp.
Later, he started to play the bass influenced by the modern jazz band Aka Moon and the bassist Michel Hatzigeorgiou.

Magalon has worked with Belgian jazz musicians such as Jeroen Van Herzeele, Bart Defoort, Stephane Mercier, Dominic Ntoumos and musicians from rock and funk like Rudy Lenners (Scorpions), Rudy Trouvé (dEUS, Kiss My Jazz, Dead Man Ray), and Nick Van Gelder.

In 2007, Magalon performed at the MIDEM of Cannes in France with his drumless trio featuring Stephane Mercier on saxophone and Georges Hermans on piano.

In 2008 Magalon decided to take a break from playing professionally, only to experiment with the other side of music, working as manager for the Engine Room Club in South East England. He welcomed bands like the Germs, Hed PE, The Addicts, inMe, Discharge, Acid Mothers Temple, Death Angel.

References

External links
 Presence, Centre Culturel Dison, Issue 312, Nov 2009
 Artistes Belges, November 2010
 Maison du Jazz, February 2007
 Talentris 16 May 2007

Belgian jazz guitarists
1975 births
Living people
Belgian expatriates in the United Kingdom
Belgian bass guitarists
21st-century bass guitarists